Keyara Wardley (born December 1, 1998) is a Canadian rugby union player, in the sevens discipline.

Career
Wardley was part of Canada's 2018 Summer Youth Olympics team that won the bronze medal.

In June 2021, Wardley was named to Canada's 2020 Olympic team. She competed for Canada at the 2022 Rugby World Cup Sevens in Cape Town. They placed sixth overall after losing to Fiji in the fifth place final.

References

2000 births
Living people
Sportspeople from Calgary
Rugby sevens players at the 2018 Summer Youth Olympics
Canada international rugby sevens players
Rugby sevens players at the 2020 Summer Olympics
Olympic rugby sevens players of Canada
Canada international women's rugby sevens players
Youth Olympic bronze medalists for Canada
Medalists at the 2018 Summer Youth Olympics
21st-century Canadian women
Rugby sevens players at the 2022 Commonwealth Games